Dee Lyngstad Brown (born October 22, 1948) is an American politician from Montana.  Brown, a Republican, represented District 3 (District 83, prior to 2005) in Flathead County in the Montana House of Representatives.  Brown served as a member of the House Federal Relations, Energy, and Telecommunications committee, and as vice chair of the Legislative Administration and State Administration committees.

In 2006, Brown ran unsuccessfully for District 3 as an independent,  losing to Democrat Douglas Cordier.

See also 
 Montana House of Representatives, District 3

References 

Members of the Montana House of Representatives
Living people
1948 births
Women state legislators in Montana
Montana Republicans
Montana Independents
21st-century American politicians
21st-century American women politicians